Dudyńce  (Dudyntsi), village in East Małopolska in the Beskid mountains, Bukowsko rural commune, parish in loco. Location of Dudynce, sometimes spelled Dwdinicze 1372–1378, Dudenycze - 1436, de Dudenyecz - 1448,  Dudence - 1678. Dudyńce is located near the town of Sanok (now in southeastern Poland), located near the towns of Dukla and Palota (in northeastern Slovakia).

Dudyńce is about 10 miles from Sanok in southeast Poland. It is situated below the main watershed at the foot of the Słonne Mountain, and has an elevation of 250 metres. Situated in the Subcarpathian Voivodship (since 1999), previously in Krosno Voivodship (1975-1998) and Sanok District, (10 miles east of Sanok), parish Bukowsko.

Dudyńce was founded in 1372 by prince Władysław Opolczyk. From 966–1018, 1340-1772 (Ruthenian Voivodeship) and from 1918-1939 Dudyńce was part of Poland. While during 1772-1918 it belonged to Austrian empire; later the Austrian-Hungarian empire.

Literature
 Prof. Adam Fastnacht.  Slownik Historyczno-Geograficzny Ziemi Sanockiej w Średniowieczu (Historic-Geographic Dictionary of the Sanok District in the Middle Ages), Kraków, 2002, .
Jerzy Zuba "W Gminie Bukowsko". Roksana, 2004, . Translated by Deborah Greenlee. Arlington, TX 76016.

Villages in Sanok County